James Douglas Phinney,  (November 17, 1844 – February 28, 1915) was a lawyer, judge and political figure in New Brunswick, Canada. He represented Kent County in the Legislative Assembly of New Brunswick from 1887 to 1895 as a Liberal-Conservative.

He was born in Richibucto, New Brunswick, the son of Zaccheus Phinney and Elizabeth Clark, and studied at the University of New Brunswick. He taught school for some time, went on to study law and was called to the bar in 1869. Phinney became clerk in the court for Kent County in 1871. In 1872, he married Fannie J. Davis. He served as judge of probate from 1878 to 1887. He also served as school trustee and was a director for the Kent Northern Railway. He was first elected to the provincial assembly in an 1887 by-election held after William Wheton resigned his seat. Phinney was named Queen's Counsel in 1891. He died in 1915 and was buried in Fredericton Rural Cemetery.

References 

The Canadian parliamentary companion, 1891, JA Gemmill
The Canadian men and women of the time a handbook of Canadian biography, HJ Morgan (1898)

1844 births
1915 deaths
Canadian King's Counsel
Judges in New Brunswick
Progressive Conservative Party of New Brunswick MLAs